The goat catfish (Arius sumatranus), also called the marine catfish, is a species of sea catfish in the family Ariidae. Although the author of the species is uncertain, its description has been attributed to Edward Turner Bennett, in 1830. It was originally assigned to the genus Bagrus. It inhabits tropical marine and brackish waters in the Indo-western Pacific region, including eastern Thailand, the Philippines, Pakistan and Indonesia.

The diet of the goat catfish consists of benthic invertebrates. It is of commercial interest to fisheries, and is usually marketed fresh.

References

goat catfish
Catfish of Asia
Catfish of Oceania
Fish of the Indian Ocean
Marine fish of Southeast Asia
goat catfsh